The South African Railways Class GDA 2-6-2+2-6-2 of 1929 was an articulated steam locomotive.

In December 1929, the South African Railways placed five Class GDA Garratt articulated locomotives with a 2-6-2+2-6-2 Double Prairie type wheel arrangement in branch line service on the Natal North Coast line.

Manufacturer
The Class GDA 2-6-2+2-6-2 Double Prairie type Garratt locomotive was built to the same specifications and was for all intents and purposes identical to the Class GD in its main dimensions. They were ordered from Linke-Hofmann Werke AG in Breslau, Germany in 1929 and numbered 2255 to 2259 upon delivery in December of that same year.

Characteristics
The locomotive had the same tractive effort as the Class GD, was also superheated and also had Walschaerts valve gear to actuate its piston valves. The main differences were the use of bar frames instead of plate frames, differently shaped coal and water bunkers, and a round-topped firebox instead of a Belpaire firebox.

Service
The five locomotives were placed in service working out of Cape Town where they were to join the Class GD on the Overberg branch across Sir Lowry's Pass to Caledon and Bredasdorp, but they were found to be not satisfactory in service and ended up being staged on a siding near the Cape Town sheds for a considerable time. When a question was raised in the local press, enquiring the reason why these brand new locomotives were not being used, they were first moved to a less conspicuous location and shortly afterwards transferred to Natal.

The Natal shops managed to get the locomotives to perform satisfactorily and they were placed in branch line service on the North Coast line in Natal, working around Stanger. This line contains long gradients of 1 in 40 (2½%) and severe curvature with curves of  radius. Some locomotives later ended up working on the Port Alfred branch. In 1970 a pair was sent to Port Elizabeth where they worked local goods trains until they were all withdrawn by 1972.

SAR locomotive policy
During the term of office of Colonel F.R. Collins DSO as SAR Chief Mechanical Engineer from 1922 to 1929 articulated locomotives were in great favour in South Africa, to the extent that the Railway Board of the day instructed that non-articulated engines should only be ordered in exceptional circumstances. His retirement in 1929 brought about a change in policy, however, and there would be an interval of nearly a decade before another articulated Cape gauge Garratt would be acquired.

Preservation
Two locomotives were "preserved". No. 2257 was plinthed at Grahamstown Station. After the branch line via Grahamstown to Port Alfred fell into disuse, however, an apathetic local government allowed Grahamstown's historic station buildings and especially the plinthed locomotive to be vandalised to an eyesore state by 2013. Another engine, no. 2259, was staged at the South African National Railway And Steam Museum in Krugersdorp.

Illustration

References

2400
Linke-Hofmann locomotives
2-6-2+2-6-2 locomotives
Garratt locomotives
Cape gauge railway locomotives
Railway locomotives introduced in 1929
1929 in South Africa
Scrapped locomotives